Enn Leisson (11 July 1942 Tallinn – 10 June 1998 Tallinn) was an Estonian politician and journalist.

He was a member of XII Supreme Soviet of Estonia. He was also a member of Congress of Estonia, and Constitutional Assembly of Estonia.

He wrote several screenwritings for documentary films.

References

1942 births
1998 deaths
Estonian screenwriters
Estonian journalists
Communist Party of Estonia politicians
Politicians from Tallinn
20th-century screenwriters